Borun Qeshlaq (also Romanized as Borūn Qeshlāq; also known as Bīrūn Qeshlāq) is a village in Qezel Gechilu Rural District of the Central District of Mahneshan County, Zanjan province, Iran. At the 2006 National Census, its population was 429 in 110 households. The following census in 2011 counted 438 people in 126 households. The latest census in 2016 showed a population of 509 people in 159 households; it was the largest village in its rural district.

References 

Mahneshan County

Populated places in Zanjan Province

Populated places in Mahneshan County